Truro Cathedral School was a Church of England school for boys in Truro, Cornwall. An ancient school refounded in 1549 as the Truro Grammar School, after the establishment of Truro Cathedral in the last quarter of the 19th century it was responsible for educating the cathedral's choristers and became known as the Cathedral School.

The school closed in July 1982 and the education of choristers was transferred to Polwhele House Preparatory School.

History
An ancient foundation, the school existed before the Reformation as the chantry school of St Mary's Church, Truro. In 1549, following Edward VI's Abolition of Chantries Act of 1547 which suppressed all chantries, the school was refounded and took on a new identity as Truro Grammar School. However, as reported by Nicholas Carlisle in his survey of 1818, "The Grammar School at Truro owes its origin and endowment to some benevolent person, whose name is now not known." The best evidence of the refounding of the school is an entry in the Journal of the House of Commons dated 21 May 1689, which refers to the grammar school being founded by a deed, since lost, of the third year of King Edward VI.

In 1767, the Rev. St John Eliot, a former Rector of Truro, founded two Exhibitions tenable only at Exeter College, Oxford, worth £30 a year each, with preference to be given to boys from the school. In 1818 Carlisle reported that over the previous ten years the number of scholars had been about fifty and that 

In the early 19th century an "anniversary school meeting" took place on every second Thursday in September, being a gathering of the school's former pupils. Cyrus Redding, in his An Illustrated Itinerary of the County of Cornwall (1842) called Truro Grammar School "the most celebrated school in the county".

With the creation of the Diocese of Truro in 1876 from the Cornish part of the old Diocese of Exeter, the 16th-century parish church of St Mary's was designated as a cathedral. The church was then partly demolished and partly incorporated into the new neo-Gothic Truro Cathedral, built on the same site. The pupils of the old grammar school had worshipped at St Mary's and became responsible for providing the new cathedral's choristers. It thus began to be known as the "Cathedral School".

In 1906 the school was established as Truro Cathedral School by the Dean and Chapter as a Church of England public school. By the early 20th century the school was a private school and had a boarding house called Trewinnard Court. The buildings were designed by the cathedral architect F. L. Pearson and built in the precincts of the cathedral. In 1925 the headmaster resided at Trewinnard Court. At that time choristers paid no tuition fees and there were two Bray scholarships open to choristers worth £30 p.a. The Hawkins scholarship worth £80 p.a. was open to former pupils studying at a university and tenable for three years. By the 1920s the cathedral school's reputation had significantly increased.

During the Second World War, the school took the junior boys evacuated from St Paul's, London, some of whom joined the Truro Cathedral choir.

In 1949, the school was occupying Copeland Court, Kenwyn, formerly the bishop's palace known as 'Lis Escop'. Until 1960, the school had a large building in the Cathedral Close. In 1968 the school's age range was from seven to eighteen. There were 212-day boys and 109 boarders. Of these, twenty-two were cathedral choristers.

In 1974 the school was teaching Cornish wrestling as part of its physical education programme and was the only school in Cornwall to do so. In 1979 it was reported to provide "continuous education for boys from 7–18 either as boarders or as day boys".

Closure and aftermath
The Times reported on 19 April 1982 that Viscount Falmouth, the chairman of the school's governing body, had written to parents to break the news that the school would close at the end of that year's Summer term. The stated reason was "deteriorating finances", and Lord Falmouth said in his letter that the decision had been taken "with very great reluctance, after exploring all possible alternatives and after considering professional advice". John Wolters, the headmaster, wrote separately to parents to say that the school would help to find places for its boys in other schools. The other members of staff responded by issuing a statement on 18 April to say they were hoping the school could continue, "if necessary on a reconstituted basis".

Reasons which have since been suggested for the closure include a lack of modern facilities, the economic downturn of the early 1980s, and the changing priorities of leaders of the Church of England, which owned the school buildings. George Eustice, an old boy of the school, has said he suspects the Church may have wished to close the school to raise funds for repairing the roof of Truro Cathedral.

A limited liability company called Truro Cathedral School Ltd was incorporated on 21 November 1960 and is still in existence. 
The school's task of providing the cathedral's choristers has been transferred to the neighbouring Polwhele House Preparatory School, and the number of choristers is now eighteen.

The former school building in the Cathedral Close is now called "Old Cathedral School" and is currently an office building; it was used as such by the Cornwall Council unitary authority until the council gave it up. The building is still owned by the cathedral. The Cornwall Record Office holds the school's archives, including "lists of masters, pupils and benefactors" dating between 1612 and 1876 and the governors' cash books from 1882 to 1984.

Notable former pupils
See also Category:People educated at Truro Cathedral School

Those educated at the school are known as "Old Truronians" and include (in chronological order):

Sir Edmund Prideaux (died 1659), Roundhead, member of parliament for Lyme Regis, and Solicitor General 
Samuel Enys (1611–1697), Royalist and member of parliament for Penryn
Swete Nicholas Archer, High Sheriff of Cornwall, 1757
Admiral Sir Richard Spry (1715–1775), Royal Navy Commander-in-Chief, North America and West Indies Station and Mediterranean Fleet
Samuel Foote (1720–1777), actor and playwright
Thomas Haweis (1734–1820), clergyman
Thomas Wills (1740–1802), minister
William Macarmick (1742–1815), member of parliament and Lieutenant-Governor of Cape Breton Colony
John Vivian  (1750–1826), Vice-Warden of the Stannaries of Cornwall
Jonathan Hornblower (1753–1815), pioneer of steam power
Colonel John Lemon (1754–1814), Whig member of parliament for Truro
Admiral Edward Pellew, 1st Viscount Exmouth (1757–1833), naval commander of the Napoleonic Wars
Francis Gregor of Trewarthenick (1760–1815), knight of the shire for Cornwall
The Rev. Richard Polwhele (1760–1838), poet and topographer
Pascoe Grenfell (1761–1838), member of parliament
Thomas Tregenna Biddulph (1763–1838), clergyman 
Lieutenant General Hussey Vivian, 1st Baron Vivian (1775–1842), Peninsular War commander
Joseph Batten DD FRS (1778–1837), principal of the East India Company College
Sir Humphry Davy (1778–1829), chemist and inventor
Henry Martyn (1781–1812), Anglican missionary
Fortescue Hichins (1784–1814) poet and historian
Thomas Turner (1793–1873), surgeon
Nicholas Michell (1807–1880), poet
Walter Hawken Tregellas (1831–1894), author
Francis Charles Hingeston-Randolph (1833–1910), clergyman and antiquary
O. W. Tancock (1839–1930), clergyman and author  
Arthur Williams (1899–1974), Church of England clergyman
Gerald Hocken Knight (1908–1979), organist
David Mudd (1933–2020), Conservative member of parliament for Falmouth and Camborne
Christopher J. Turner (1933–2014), diplomat and Governor of Montserrat
Andrew Graham (born 1942), former Master of Balliol College, Oxford
Peter Grimwade (1942–1990), television writer and director
Nick Darke (1948–2005), playwright
Roger Taylor (born 1949) drummer of the band Queen
George Eustice (born 1971), member of Parliament for Camborne and Redruth

Masters and headmasters
Until the nineteenth century, the school usually had only one professional schoolmaster, called "the master". Once it needed more staff the title became "headmaster".
 
1600–1609: John Hodge
1609–1612: Thomas Syms
1612–1618: Matthew Sharrock
1618–1620: Nicholas Upcot
1621–1635: Rev. George Fitzpen (or Phippen)
1635–1666: William White
1666–1685: Richard Jago
1685–1693: Henry Greenfield
1693–1698: Simon Paget
1698–1706: John Hillman
1706–1728: Thomas Hankyn & Joseph Jane
1728–1771: George Conon
1771–1804: Dr Cornelius Cardew (DD, Oxon)
1805– : Thomas Hogg 
1891–1896: Rev. Thomas Fisher Maddrell, MA (Cantab.)
1897–1901: Rev. Francis George Elwes Field, MA (Cantab.)
1937–1973: Max Stanley Mischler, MA (Oxon.) (1910–1995)
1974–1979: F. S. G. Pearson, MA (Oxon.) (1935–2012)
1979–1982: John C. Wolters, MA (Cantab.)

Old Truronians Association
An Old Truronians Association brings together former pupils of the school and continues to hold an annual dinner.

Further reading

Robin Eric Davidson, The History of Truro Grammar and Cathedral School. Mevagissey: Kingston Publications, 1970

Notes

External links
Truro Cathedral School accessions in Cornwall Record Office, indexed at nationalarchives.gov.uk
Truro Cathedral School, photograph of old building at pcpki.com 

Defunct schools in Cornwall
Educational institutions established in the 1540s
Educational institutions disestablished in 1982
 
1549 establishments in England
1982 disestablishments in England
Truro
Cathedral schools
Defunct Church of England schools